Baby Faith is an album by Japanese singer Misato Watanabe. It was released on September 7, 1994 by Sony Music Entertainment.

Track listing 
あなたの全部
20th Century Children
真夏のサンタクロース
Shout (ココロの花びら)
初恋
Change
Baby
チェリーが3つ並ばない
こんな風の日には
ムーンライト ピクニック
I Wish

External links 
Sony Music Entertainment - Official site for Watanabe Misato. 
Album Page - Direct link to page with song listing and music samples.

1994 albums
Misato Watanabe albums